Lissotesta decipiens is a species of minute sea snail, a marine gastropod mollusc, unassigned in the superfamily Seguenzioidea.

Distribution
This marine species occurs off New Zealand.

References

 Powell A. W. B., New Zealand Mollusca, William Collins Publishers Ltd, Auckland, New Zealand 1979 

decipiens
Gastropods of New Zealand
Gastropods described in 1940